Shayban can refer to:

 Shayban, an Arab tribe, prominent in the medieval Jazira
 Shiban, a 13th-century Mongol prince, grandson of Genghis Khan

See also 
 Shaybanids